The 2023 Prime Minister's Three Nations Cup is a friendly international association football tournament organised and controlled by the All Nepal Football Association (ANFA) is scheduled to be played from 22 to 31 March 2023 at Kathmandu, Nepal.

Participating nations
The FIFA Rankings of participating national teams as of 22 December 2022.

Venue
All four matches will be played in the following venue.

Standings
<onlyinclude>
<onlyinclude>

Matches

Final

Statistics

Goalscorers

References

International association football competitions hosted by Nepal
Tri-Nations Cup